The South of France Championships  its original name also known as the Championships of the South of France and the Championship of Southern France was a tennis event held from 1895 through 1971 it was originally played at the Nice Lawn Tennis Club in Nice, France. It was one of the tournaments of the French Riviera tennis circuit.

History
Lawn tennis was introduced to French Riviera by English, who decided to holiday on the Cote d'Azur after Queen Victoria vacationed there during the late 1800s. The Riviera season was usually December through to March and a number of events would be staged in Nice the South of France Championships was considered the best of these early continental tournaments  other events founded around this time included the Nice Championships, the Nice Lawn Tennis Club Championships and later the Nice International.  Nice Lawn Tennis Club was founded in 1890 at Place Mozart. In 1895 the South of France Championships tournament began, the dates the event was held fluctuated between February, March and April annually the club and championships changed location to Parc Imperial Avenue Suzanne Lenglen in 1923. It was one of the earliest events open to international players, the tournament survived for a period of 76 years until 1971.

Finals
Notes: Challenge Round: The final round of a tournament, in which the winner of a single-elimination phase faces the previous year's champion, who plays only that one match. The challenge round was used in the early history of tennis (from 1877 through 1921) in some tournaments not all. * Indicates challenger

Men's singles

Women's singles

Records

Men's singles
Source: The Tennisbase included 
Most titles:   Laurence Doherty, (8)
Most consecutive titles:   Laurence Doherty, (7)
Most finals:   Laurence Doherty, (8)
Most consecutive finals:  Laurence Doherty, (7)
Most matches played:  Pierre Darmon, (39)
Most matches won:  Pierre Darmon, (33)
Most consecutive match wins:  Anthony Wilding, and  Laurence Doherty, (19)
Most editions played:  Georges Goven, (12)
Best match winning %: Laurence Doherty and  Reginald Doherty (100%) 
Longest final:  Jacques Brichant v  Bobby Wilson, result: 9–11, 6–3, 6–2, 7–9, 6–4 (63 games), (1957)
Shortest final:  Armando Vieira v  József Asbóth, result: 6–1, 6–1 (14 games) (1953) 
Shortest final:  Sergio Tacchini v  Jean-Noël Grinda, result: 6–4, 4–0 retired (14 games) (1964)
Title won with the fewest games lost,  Anthony Wilding, (12), (1908)
Oldest champion:  Gordon Lowe, 38y 8m and 23d, (1923)
Youngest champion:  René Lacoste, 19y 8m and 9d, (1924)

See also
 Monte-Carlo Masters
 Open de Nice Côte d'Azur

References

Sources 

 
 Ayre's Lawn Tennis Almanack And Tournament Guide, A. Wallis Myers. UK.
 Dunlop Lawn Tennis Almanack And Tournament Guide, G.P. Hughes, 1939 to 1958, Published by Dunlop Sports Co. Ltd, UK.
 Lowe's Lawn Tennis Annuals and Compendia, Lowe, Sir F. Gordon, Eyre & Spottiswoode.

External links
Nice Lawn Tennis Club
Tennisbase The South of France Championships-Roll of Honor

Clay court tennis tournaments
Defunct tennis tournaments in France